Buckhorn Lake may refer to one of several lakes:

Buckhorn Lake (Ontario), Canada
Buckhorn Lake (Kentucky), United States
Buckhorn Lake (Houston), Texas, United States

See also
Lower Buckhorn Lake, Peterborough County, Ontario, Canada